Ahmad Ali bin Haji A. Karim (Jawi: احمد علي بن حاج عبدالكريم; born February 13 2003) is a Malaysian writer who writes analysis regarding the local political landscape as well as the laws of Malaysia, specifically the Federal Constitution. His views has appeared on newspaper columns and on his personal blog, which, as of August 2020, has over 1.5 million readers. He is currently a weekly columnist at Utusan Malaysia.

Personal life 
Ali Karim was born in 2003 in Kuala Terengganu, Malaysia, and is the youngest son of the late Malaysian Muslim activist, A. Karim Omar. He is a direct descendant to Tun Habib Abdul Majid of the House of Bendahara in Johor, and also has a Chinese ancestry on another side.

He is a home-school student who learns with the help of his mother, and was said to have developed an interest in law since he was small. Aside from the normal school syllabus, he also studies law with International Islamic University Malaysia (IIUM) professor, Prof. Madya Dr. Shamrahayu Abd. Aziz, aside from some other experts in the field.

He begins writing on the year 2008 on his weblog, Ahmad Ali Karim's Weblog. In 2017, he began presenting and giving speeches regarding the laws of Malaysia and on current issues at schools in Johor, Malaysia, in a tour around the entire state called Jelajah Kemerdekaan (Independence Tour) which was organised by Muafakat Pendidikan Johor (MPJ) with the support of the state government.

Ali Karim is also said to have an interest in digital art and has multiple times won a digital art contest made by Microsoft Studios.

Career & achievements 
Ali Karim began writing at the age of 5 on August 28, 2008. Since he was 9 years of age, he began writing political analysations in relation to the situation in Malaysia.

His writings gained attention from multiple people including the Prime Minister of Malaysia, Mahathir Mohamad, who wrote an official letter to him on January 11, 2017, answering Ali Karim's article regarding the alliance of Pakatan Harapan (PH) and Malaysian United Indigenous Party (BERSATU) that was said to have contradicted with the constitution. Local newspaper, Berita Harian, has also once made an exclusive news report regarding him on June 5, 2018.

He was a frequent writer on two online portals, Menara.my and Tanjak.my, and he is currently the official ambassador of Muafakat Pendidikan Johor (MPJ).

On July 15, 2019, Ali Karim was appointed as a columnist on the local newspaper, Utusan Malaysia, where he writes regarding the Malaysian constitution and the Malay Rulers, before Utusan Melayu (Malaysia) Berhad, the owner of the daily ceased its operations on October 9, 2019. Ali Karim would later be reappointed as a columnist on the same paper upon its revival under their new owner, Media Mulia Sdn. Bhd. in July 2020.

Police report on Lim Guan Eng 
On November 23, 2016, Ali Karim lodges a police report against the then Chief Minister of Penang, Malaysia, Lim Guan Eng, regarding his alleged seditious statement on the Syariah Courts (Criminal Jurisdiction) Act 1965 Amendment Bill (more frequently known as Act 355 or Akta 355).

This received the response of many political figures, notably Guan Eng himself who says that the police report was frivolous and baseless. The then Deputy Minister in the Prime Minister's Department, Dato' Dr. Asyraf Wajdi Dusuki, however, defended Ali Karim's actions, saying that Guan Eng should be ashamed that a 13 years old teen understands the constitution more than him. Ali Karim was also featured on the front-cover of Utusan Malaysia when Pertubuhan Pribumi Perkasa (PERKASA) president, Dato' Paduka Dr. Ibrahim Ali visited his house in support of his move.

References

External links 
 Official website
 Ahmad Ali Karim's channel on YouTube

2003 births
Living people
People from Terengganu
Malaysian people of Malay descent
Malaysian Muslims
Terengganu writers